Authoor is a panchayat town in Thoothukudi district of the Indian state of Tamil Nadu.

Demographics 

, according to the India census, Authoor has a population of 14,470. 50% of the population is male, while 50% is female. Authoor has an average literacy rate of 79%, higher than the national average of 59.5%. Male literacy is 82% and female literacy is 76%. 12% of the population is under 6 years of age.

Agriculture, water and natural resources 
Many of the people of Authoor are farmers of betel leaf, banana and rice. The quality of betel leaf from Authoor is famous for its quality in Tamil Nadu. Authoor is also famous for the Thamirabarani river surrounding the town. The river provides a majority of the water used for irrigation in and around the area.

Authoor is a green town, surrounded by rice paddies and banana trees. The Thamirabarani River flows through the area, forming a big lake on one end. This makes the town a major attraction.

Temples 
 Thousand-year-old Sri Somanatha temple is situated at Authoor
 Iyyappan temple at the end of palayagramam
 Nalla pillaiyar kovil at Authoor
 Sri Mutharamman kovil, pettai street famous temple in north authoor, Sri Santhana Mari amman temple at authoor
 Mohaideen Jumma Masjit South Authoor 1. km

Nearest Temples
 Thiruchendur Murugan Temple is the second of the Arupadai Vedu at tiruchendur(18 km)
 Sri Kailashanathar temple Sernthapoomangalam (2 km)
 Sri Vaikundanatha Perumal Temple srivaikudam (23 km)
 Kulasekaranpatinam, a village 30 km away, is known for its Dasara festival. The village has the only temple where Mutharamman is shown with his consort

Sports and games 
There are no specialized grounds for youngsters at Authoor dedicated to sports or games, but, during summer, lake dries out, forming a neat green ground for the local students to play cricket and other games. Additionally, there is a small ground near the Somanathar somasundari amman temple where men play volleyball, cricket, and football.

Education 
Schools

 Sri Ganesar Higher Secondary School, Panicka nadar kudieruppu(8 km)
 Al Madrasatul Abbasiya Arabic School South Authoor
 Govt Higher Secondary School Authoor
 Panchayat Union Middle School South Authoor
 Shanmuga Nadar Middle School, Authoor

Nearest schools
 Kanchi Sankara Matriculation School, West Tiruchendur (15 km)
 Kamalavathi Higher Secondary School, Sahupuram (6 km)
Pearl Public School CBSE, Arumuganeri (9 km)
 Lk Higher Secondary School, Kayalpatnam (8 km)
 Kayalpatinam Arumuganeri Higher Secondary School (7 km)
 Central Higher Secondary School, Kayalpantnam (8 km)
 St. Antony's Higher Secondary School, Pazhaiyakayal(6 km)

Nearest Colleges
 Dr.Sivanthi Aditanar College of Engineering, Tiruchendur (18 km)
 Government Medical College, Tuticorin (23 km)
 wavoo wajeeha women's college of arts & science (Kayalpatinam)
 Dr.G.U.Pope College of Engineering, Sawyerpuram (13 km)
 Holycross Engineering College, Tannuthu (24 km)
 Chandy College of Engineering, Mullakadu (13 km)
 Aditanar College of Arts and Science, Tiruchendur (18 km)
 Govindammal Aditanar College for Women, Tiruchendur (18 km)
 Dr. Sivanthi Aditanar College of Education, Tiruchendur (18 km)
 Dr. Sivanthi Aditanar Teacher Training Institute, Tiruchendur (18 km)
 Dr. Sivanthi Aditanar College of Physical Education, Tiruchendur (18 km)
 V.O.C Arts and Science College Tuticorin (21 km)

Transport services
Airway:
 Domestic Airport, Vagaikullam (22 km)
Railway:
 Arumuganeri(ANY) railway station(4km)
Tuticorin(TN) railway station(24 km)
Seaway:
 V.O.Chidambaranar Port Trust, Tuticorin (25 km)

See also 
 Srivaikuntam
 Umarikadu
 Vazhavallan
 Maranthalai

References

Panchayat Union Middle School South Authoor

Cities and towns in Thoothukudi district